Margot Ruth Prior  (24 March 1937 – 24 August 2020) was an Australian psychologist, educator and musician. She was professor of psychology at the University of Melbourne where her research focussed on autism and literacy development. She was also director of psychology at the Royal Children's Hospital and was adjunct professor at La Trobe University.

Biography 

Prior was born on 24 March 1937 in Melbourne, Victoria. Prior graduated from the University of Melbourne with a BMus and a BA. She completed an MSc and PhD at Monash University.

Prior was elected a Fellow of the Academy of the Social Sciences in Australia in 1992. She was awarded a DSc (honoris causa) by the University of Melbourne and was a Fellow of the Australian Psychological Society. 

In the 2004 Australia Day Honours Prior was made an Officer of the Order of Australia for "service to the discipline of psychology in the areas of developmental and clinical psychology and for research leading to significant advances in the care and treatment of children with autism, learning difficulties and anxiety disorders". She was Victorian Senior Australian of the Year in 2006.

Selected works

Personal 
Prior's first husband was musician Glenthorne Prior, who drowned when their three children were young. She later married John Hansen. She died on 24 August 2020 due to COVID-19.

References

External links 

 Margot Prior AO bio, The Royal Children's Hospital Melbourne
Professor Margot Prior AO, Citation for the Award of Doctor of Science (Honoris Causa)

1937 births
2020 deaths
Australian psychologists
Australian women psychologists
Officers of the Order of Australia
University of Melbourne alumni
Monash University alumni
Academic staff of the University of Melbourne
Academic staff of La Trobe University
Fellows of the Academy of the Social Sciences in Australia
Musicians from Melbourne
Academics from Melbourne